Agelena lingua is a species of spider in the family Agelenidae, which contains at least 1,350 species of funnel-web spiders . It was first described by Embrik Strand, in 1913. It is primarily found in Central Africa.

References

lingua
Spiders of Africa
Spiders described in 1913